Sigli is a town in Aceh province of Indonesia and it is the seat (capital) of Pidie Regency.
Sigli is located 112 kilometers to the south of the capital of Aceh province, Banda Aceh.

Sport

Persatuan Sepakbola Aceh Pidie is the football club from Sigli.

Climate
Sigli has a tropical monsoon climate (Am) with moderate rainfall from February to September and heavy rainfall from October to January.

References

 
Populated places in Aceh
Regency seats of Aceh